This was the sixth season for the League Cup, which was once again known as the Players No.6 Trophy because of its sponsorship.

Castleford won the final, beating Blackpool Borough by the score of 25-15. The match was played at The Willows, Salford. The attendance was 4,512 and receipts were £2,919.

Background 
The council of the Rugby Football League voted to introduce a new competition, to be similar to The Football Association and Scottish Football Association's "League Cup". It was to be a similar knock-out structure to, and to be secondary to, the Challenge Cup. As this was being formulated, sports sponsorship was becoming more prevalent and as a result John Player and Sons, a division of Imperial Tobacco Company, became sponsors, and the competition never became widely known as the "League Cup" 
The competition ran from 1971–72 until 1995-96 and was initially intended for the professional clubs plus the two amateur BARLA National Cup finalists. In later seasons the entries were expanded to take in other amateur and French teams. The competition was dropped due to "fixture congestion" when Rugby League became a summer sport
The Rugby League season always (until the onset of "Summer Rugby" in 1996) ran from around August-time through to around May-time and this competition always took place early in the season, in the Autumn, with the final usually taking place in late January 
The competition was variably known, by its sponsorship name, as the Player's No.6 Trophy (1971–1977), the John Player Trophy (1977–1983), the John Player Special Trophy (1983–1989), and the Regal Trophy in 1989.

Competition and results 
This season saw no changes in the  entrants, no new members and no withdrawals, the number remaining at thirty-two. For the  second season there were no drawn matches in the  competition.

Round 1 - First  Round 

Involved  16 matches and 32 Clubs

Round 2 - Second  Round 

Involved  8 matches and 16 Clubs

Round 3 -Quarter Finals 

Involved 4 matches with 8 clubs

Round 4 – Semi-Finals 

Involved 2 matches and 4 Clubs

Final

Teams and scorers 

Scoring - Try = three points - Goal = two points - Drop goal = one point

Prize money 
As part of the sponsorship deal and funds, the  prize money awarded to the competing teams for this season is as follows :-

Note - the  author is unable to trace the award amounts for this season. Can anyone help ?

The road to success 
This tree excludes any preliminary round fixtures

Notes 
1 * Ovenden are a Junior (amateur) club from Halifax
2 * Ovenden were drawn at home but chose to give away home advantage
3 * Ace Caravans were a Junior (amateur) club from Hull
4 * Ace Caravans were drawn at home but chose to give away home advantage
5 * The Rothmans Yearbooks 1990-91 and 1991-92 gave the attendance as 3,037 but The News of the World/Empire News annual 1977–78 gave it as 3,680
6 * The News of the World/Empire News annual 1977–78 gives the score as 13-25 but other sources including RUGBYLEAGUEprojects, Wigan official archives give the score as 13-28
7 * Wigan's  (No. 4) Bill Francis & York's  (No. 11) Gary Hetherington were both sent off for fighting in the 78th Minute
8 * Wigan official website states incorrectly that the match date was Saturday 27 November
9  * The Willows was the home ground of Salford with a final capacity of 11,363 which included 2,500 seats. The record attendance was 26,470 on the 13 February 1937 in the Challenge Cup first round match  vs Warr

See also 
1976–77 Northern Rugby Football League season
1976 Lancashire Cup
1976 Yorkshire Cup
Player's No.6 Trophy
Rugby league county cups

References

External links
Saints Heritage Society
1896–97 Northern Rugby Football Union season at wigan.rlfans.com 
Hull&Proud Fixtures & Results 1896/1897
Widnes Vikings - One team, one passion Season In Review - 1896-97
The Northern Union at warringtonwolves.org
Huddersfield R L Heritage
Wakefield until I die

1976 in English rugby league
1977 in English rugby league
League Cup (rugby league)